M. Anjan Kumar Yadav (born 5 May 1961) is an Indian politician serving as the Working President of Telangana Pradesh Congress Committee. He was an MP of Lok Sabha of India. He represented the Secunderabad constituency of Telangana and is a member of the Indian National Congress (INC) political party. He lost the 2014 elections to BJP candidate  Bandaru Dattatreya from Secunderabad.

External links
 Home Page on the Parliament of India's Website
 Anjan Kumar Yadav's Website

1961 births
Indian National Congress politicians from Telangana
Living people
Politicians from Secunderabad
India MPs 2004–2009
India MPs 2009–2014
Lok Sabha members from Andhra Pradesh
Indian National Congress politicians from Andhra Pradesh